The following lists identify, characterize, and link to more thorough information on file systems.
Many older operating systems support only their one "native" file system, which does not bear any name apart from the name of the operating system itself.

Disk file systems 
Disk file systems are usually block-oriented. Files in a block-oriented file system are sequences of blocks, often featuring fully random-access read, write, and modify operations.

 ADFS – Acorn's Advanced Disc filing system, successor to DFS.
 AdvFS – Advanced File System, designed by Digital Equipment Corporation for their Digital UNIX (now Tru64 UNIX) operating system.
 APFS – Apple File System is a next-generation file system for Apple products.
 AthFS – AtheOS File System, a 64-bit journaled filesystem now used by Syllable. Also called AFS.
 BFS – the Boot File System used on System V release 4.0 and UnixWare.
 BFS – the Be File System used on BeOS, occasionally misnamed as BeFS. Open source implementation called OpenBFS is used by the Haiku operating system.
 Byte File System (BFS) - file system used by z/VM for Unix applications
 Btrfs – is a copy-on-write file system for Linux announced by Oracle in 2007 and published under the GNU General Public License (GPL).
 CFS – The Cluster File System from Veritas, a Symantec company.  It is the parallel access version of VxFS.
 CP/M file system — Native filesystem used in the CP/M (Control Program for Microcomputers) operating system which was first released in 1974.
 DOS 3.x – Original floppy operating system and file system developed for the Apple II.
 Extent File System (EFS) – an older block filing system under IRIX.
 ext – Extended file system, designed for Linux systems.
 ext2 – Second extended file system, designed for Linux systems.
 ext3 – A journaled form of ext2.
 ext4 – A follow up for ext3 and also a journaled filesystem with support for extents.
 ext3cow – A versioning file system form of ext3.
 FAT – File Allocation Table, initially used on DOS and Microsoft Windows and now widely used for portable USB storage and some other devices; FAT12, FAT16 and FAT32 for 12-, 16- and 32-bit table depths.
 VFAT – Optional layer on Microsoft Windows FAT system to allow long (up to 255 character) filenames instead of only the 8.3 filenames allowed in the plain FAT filesystem.
 FATX – A modified version of Microsoft Windows FAT system that is used on the original Xbox console.
 FFS (Amiga) – Fast File System, used on Amiga systems. This FS has evolved over time. Now counts FFS1, FFS Intl, FFS DCache, FFS2.
 FFS – Fast File System, used on *BSD systems
 Fossil – Plan 9 from Bell Labs snapshot archival file system.
 Files-11 – OpenVMS file system; also used on some PDP-11 systems; supports record-oriented files
 Flex machine file system
 HAMMER — clustered DragonFly BSD filesystem, production-ready since DragonFly 2.2 (2009)
 HAMMER2 — recommended as the default root filesystem in DragonFly since 5.2 release in 2018
 HFS – Hierarchical File System in IBM's z/OS; not to be confused with Apple's HFS. HFS is still supported but IBM's stated direction is zFS.
 HFS – Hierarchical File System, in use until HFS+ was introduced on Mac OS 8.1. Also known as Mac OS Standard format.  Successor to Macintosh File System (MFS) & predecessor to HFS+; not to be confused with IBM's HFS provided with z/OS
 HFS+ – Updated version of Apple's HFS, Hierarchical File System, supported on Mac OS 8.1 & above, including macOS.  Supports file system journaling, enabling recovery of data after a system crash.  Also referred to as 'Mac OS Extended format or HFS Plus
 HPFS – High Performance File System, used on OS/2
 HTFS – High Throughput Filesystem, used on SCO OpenServer
 ISO 9660 – Used on CD-ROM and DVD-ROM discs (Rock Ridge and Joliet are extensions to this)
 JFS – IBM Journaling file system, provided in Linux, OS/2, and AIX.  Supports extents.
 LFS – 4.4BSD implementation of a log-structured file system
 MFS – Macintosh File System, used on early Classic Mac OS systems. Succeeded by Hierarchical File System (HFS).
 Next3 – A form of ext3 with snapshots support.
 MFS – TiVo's Media File System, a proprietary fault tolerant format used on TiVo hard drives for real time recording from live TV.
 Minix file system – Used on Minix systems
 NILFS – Linux implementation of a log-structured file system
 NTFS – (New Technology File System) Used on Microsoft's Windows NT-based operating systems
 NeXT - NeXTstation and NeXTcube file system
 NetWare File System – The original NetWare 2.x–5.x file system, used optionally by later versions.
 NSS – Novell Storage Services.  This is a new 64-bit journaling file system using a balanced tree algorithm.  Used in NetWare versions 5.0-up and recently ported to Linux.
 OneFS – One File System. This is a fully journaled, distributed file system used by Isilon. OneFS uses FlexProtect and Reed–Solomon encodings to support up to four simultaneous disk failures.
 OFS – Old File System, on Amiga. Good for floppies, but fairly useless on hard drives.
 OS-9 file system
 PFS – and PFS2, PFS3, etc. Technically interesting file system available for the Amiga, performs very well under a lot of circumstances. Very simple and elegant.
 ProDOS – Operating system and file system successor to DOS 3.x, for use on Apple's computers prior to the Macintosh & Lisa computers, the Apple series, including the IIgs
 Qnx4fs – File system that is used in QNX version 4 and 6.
 ReFS (Resilient File System) – New file system by Microsoft that is built on the foundations of NTFS (but cannot boot, has a default cluster size of 64 KB and does not support compression) and is intended to be used with the Windows Server 2012 operating system.
 ReiserFS – File system that uses journaling
 Reiser4 – File system that uses journaling, newest version of ReiserFS
 Reliance – Datalight's transactional file system for high reliability applications
 Reliance Nitro – Tree-based transactional file system developed for high-performance embedded systems, from Datalight
 RFS – Native filesystem for RTEMS
 SkyFS – Developed for SkyOS to replace BFS as the operating system's main file system. It is based on BFS, but contains many new features.
 SFS – Smart File System, journaling file system available for the Amiga platforms.
 Soup (Apple) – the "file system" for Apple Newton Platform, structured as a shallow database
 Tux3 – An experimental versioning file system intended as a replacement for ext3
 UDF – Packet-based file system for WORM/RW media such as CD-RW and DVD, now supports hard drives and flash memory as well.
 UFS – Unix File System, used on Solaris and older BSD systems
 UFS2 – Unix File System, used on newer BSD systems
 VxFS   Veritas file system, first commercial journaling file system; HP-UX, Solaris, Linux, AIX, UnixWare
VTOC (Volume Table Of Contents) -  Data structure on IBM mainframe direct-access storage devices (DASD) such as disk drives that provides a way of locating the data sets that reside on the DASD volume.
 XFS – Used on SGI IRIX and Linux systems
 zFS – z/OS File System; not to be confused with other file systems named zFS or ZFS.
 zFS - an IBM research project to develop a distributed, decentralized file system; not to be confused with other file systems named zFS or ZFS.
 ZFS a combined file system and logical volume manager designed by Sun Microsystems

File systems with built-in fault-tolerance 
These file systems have built-in checksumming and either mirroring or parity for extra redundancy on one or several block devices:
 Bcachefs – It's not yet upstream, full data and metadata checksumming, bcache is the bottom half of the filesystem.
 Btrfs – A file system based on B-Trees, initially designed at Oracle Corporation.
 HAMMER and HAMMER2 – DragonFly BSD's primary filesystems, created by Matt Dillon.
 NOVA – The "non-volatile memory accelerated" file system for persistent main memory.
 ReFS (Resilient File System) – A file system by Microsoft with built-in resiliency features.
 Reliance – A transactional file system with CRCs, created by Datalight.
 Reliance Nitro – A tree-based transactional file system with CRCs, developed for high performance and reliability in embedded systems, from Datalight.
 ZFS – Has checksums for all data; important metadata is always redundant, additional redundancy levels are user-configurable; copy-on-write and transactional writing ensure metadata consistency; corrupted data can be automatically repaired if a redundant copy is available. Created by Sun Microsystems for use on Solaris 10 and OpenSolaris, ported to FreeBSD 7.0, NetBSD (as of August 2009), Linux and to FUSE (not to be confused with the two zFSes from IBM)

File systems optimized for flash memory, solid state media 

Solid state media, such as flash memory, are similar to disks in their interfaces, but have different problems. At low level, they require special handling such as wear leveling and different error detection and correction algorithms. Typically a device such as a solid-state drive handles such operations internally and therefore a regular file system can be used. However, for certain specialized installations (embedded systems, industrial applications) a file system optimized for plain flash memory is advantageous.

 APFS – Apple File System is a next-generation file system for Apple products.
 CHFS – a NetBSD filesystem for embedded systems optimised for raw flash media.
 exFAT – Microsoft proprietary system intended for flash cards (see also XCFiles, an exFAT implementation for Wind River VxWorks and other embedded operating systems).
 ExtremeFFS – internal filesystem for SSDs.
 F2FS – Flash-Friendly File System. An open source Linux file system introduced by Samsung in 2012.
 FFS2 (presumably preceded by FFS1), one of the earliest flash file systems.  Developed and patented by Microsoft in the early 1990s.
 JFFS – original log structured Linux file system for NOR flash media.
 JFFS2 – successor of JFFS, for NAND and NOR flash.
 LSFS – a Log-structured file system with writable snapshots and inline data deduplication created by StarWind Software. Uses DRAM and flash to cache spinning disks. 
 LogFS – intended to replace JFFS2, better scalability. No longer under active development.
 NILFS – a log-structured file system for Linux with continuous snapshots.
 Non-Volatile File System – the system for flash memory introduced by Palm, Inc.
 NOVA – the "non-volatile memory accelerated" file system for persistent main memory.
 OneFS – a filesystem utilized by Isilon. It supports selective placement of meta-data directly onto flash SSD.
 Segger Microcontroller Systems emFile – filesystem for deeply embedded applications which supports both NAND and NOR flash.  Wear leveling, fast read and write, and very low RAM usage.
 SPIFFS – SPI Flash File System, a wear-leveling filesystem intended for small NOR flash devices.
 TFAT – a transactional version of the FAT filesystem.
 TrueFFS – internal file system for SSDs, implementing error correction, bad block re-mapping and wear-leveling.
 UBIFS – successor of JFFS2, optimized to utilize NAND and NOR flash.
 Write Anywhere File Layout (WAFL) – an internal file system utilized by NetApp within their DataONTAP OS, originally optimized to use non-volatile DRAM. WAFL uses RAID-DP to protect against multiple disk failures and NVRAM for transaction log replays.
 YAFFS – a log-structured file system designed for NAND flash, but also used with NOR flash.
LittleFS – a little fail-safe filesystem designed for microcontrollers.
 JesFS – Jo's embedded serial FileSystem. A very small footprint and robust filesystem, designed for very small microcontroller (16/32 bit). Open Source and licensed under GPL v3.

Record-oriented file systems 
In record-oriented file systems files are stored as a collection of records. They are typically associated with mainframe and minicomputer operating systems. Programs read and write whole records, rather than bytes or arbitrary byte ranges, and can seek to a record boundary but not within records. The more sophisticated record-oriented file systems have more in common with simple databases than with other file systems.

 CMS file system – The native file system of the Conversational Monitor System component of VM/370
 Files-11 – early versions were record-oriented; support for "streams" was added later
 Michigan Terminal System (MTS) – provides "line files" where record lengths and line numbers are associated as metadata with each record in the file, lines can be added, replaced, updated with the same or different length records, and deleted anywhere in the file without the need to read and rewrite the entire file.
 OS4000 for GEC's OS4000 operating system, on the GEC 4000 series minicomputers
 A FAT12 and FAT16 (and FAT32) extension to support database-like file types random file, direct file, keyed file and sequential file in Digital Research FlexOS, IBM 4680 OS and Toshiba 4690 OS. The record size is stored on a file-by-file basis in special entries in the directory table.
 Sequential access methods for IBM's z/OS and z/VSE mainframe operating systems: Basic Sequential Access Method (BSAM), Basic Partitioned Access Method (BPAM) and Queued Sequential Access Method (QSAM); see Access methods and Data set (IBM mainframe) for more examples
 Pick Operating System – A record-oriented filesystem and database that uses hash-coding to store data.
 Shared File System (SFS) for IBM's VM
 Virtual Storage Access Method (VSAM) for IBM's z/OS and z/VSE mainframe operating systems

Shared-disk file systems 
Shared-disk file systems (also called shared-storage file systems, SAN file system, Clustered file system or even cluster file systems) are primarily used in a storage area network where all nodes directly access the block storage where the file system is located. This makes it possible for nodes to fail without affecting access to the file system from the other nodes. Shared-disk file systems are normally used in a high-availability cluster together with storage on hardware RAID. Shared-disk file systems normally do not scale over 64 or 128 nodes.

Shared-disk file systems may be symmetric where metadata is distributed among the nodes or asymmetric with centralized metadata servers.

 CXFS (Clustered XFS) from Silicon Graphics (SGI). Available for Linux, Mac, Windows, Solaris, AIX and IRIX. Asymmetric.
 Dell Fluid File System (formerly ExaFS) proprietary software sold by Dell.  Shared-disk system sold as an appliance providing distributed file systems to clients. Running on Intel based hardware serving NFS v2/v3, SMB/CIFS and AFP to Windows, macOS, Linux and other UNIX clients.
 Blue Whale Clustered file system (BWFS) from Zhongke Blue Whale. Asymmetric. Available for Microsoft Windows, Linux, and macOS.
 SAN File System (SFS) from DataPlow. Available for Windows, Linux, Solaris, and macOS. Symmetric and Asymmetric.
 EMC Celerra HighRoad from EMC. Available for Linux, AIX, HP-UX, IRIX, Solaris and Windows. Asymmetric.
 Files-11 on VMSclusters, released by DEC in 1983, now from HP. Symmetric.
 GFS2 (Global File System) from Red Hat. Available for Linux under GPL. Symmetric (GDLM) or Asymmetric (GULM).
 IBM General Parallel File System (GPFS) Windows, Linux, AIX . Parallel
 Nasan Clustered File System from DataPlow. Available for Linux and Solaris. Asymmetric.
 Oracle ACFS from Oracle Corporation. Available for Linux (Red Hat Enterprise Linux 5 and Oracle Enterprise Linux 5 only). Symmetric.
 OCFS2 (Oracle Cluster File System) from Oracle Corporation. Available for Linux under GPL. Symmetric.
 QFS from Sun Microsystems. Available for Linux (client only) and Solaris (metadata server and client). Asymmetric.
 ScoutFS from Versity. Available for Linux under the GPL. Symmetric.
 StorNext File System from Quantum. Asymmetric. Available for AIX, HP-UX, IRIX, Linux, macOS, Solaris and Windows. Interoperable with Xsan. Formerly known as CVFS.
 Veritas Storage Foundation from Symantec. Available for AIX, HP-UX, Linux and Solaris. Asymmetric.
 Xsan from Apple Inc. Available for macOS. Asymmetric. Interoperable with StorNext File System.
 VMFS from VMware/EMC Corporation. Available for VMware ESX Server. Symmetric.

Distributed file systems 

Distributed file systems are also called network file systems. Many implementations have been made, they are location dependent and they have access control lists (ACLs), unless otherwise stated below.

 9P, the Plan 9 from Bell Labs and Inferno distributed file system protocol. One implementation is v9fs. No ACLs.
 Amazon S3
 Andrew File System (AFS) is scalable and location independent, has a heavy client cache and uses Kerberos for authentication. Implementations include the original from IBM (earlier Transarc), Arla and OpenAFS.
 Avere Systems has AvereOS that creates a NAS protocol file system in object storage.
 DCE Distributed File System (DCE/DFS) from IBM (earlier Transarc) is similar to AFS and focus on full POSIX file system semantics and high availability. Available for AIX and Solaris under a proprietary software license.
 File Access Listener (FAL) is an implementation of the Data Access Protocol (DAP) which is part of the DECnet suite of network protocols created by Digital Equipment Corporation.
 Magma, developed by Tx0.
 MapR FS is a distributed high-performance file system that exhibits file, table and messaging APIs.
 Microsoft Office Groove shared workspace, used for DoHyki
 NetWare Core Protocol (NCP) from Novell is used in networks based on NetWare.
 Network File System (NFS) originally from Sun Microsystems is the standard in UNIX-based networks. NFS may use Kerberos authentication and a client cache.
 OS4000 Linked-OS provides distributed filesystem across OS4000 systems.
 Self-certifying File System (SFS), a global network file system designed to securely allow access to file systems across separate administrative domains.
 Server Message Block (SMB) originally from IBM (but the most common version is modified heavily by Microsoft) is the standard in Windows-based networks. SMB is also known as Common Internet File System (CIFS). SMB may use Kerberos authentication.

Distributed fault-tolerant file systems 
Distributed fault-tolerant replication of data between nodes (between servers or servers/clients) for high availability and offline (disconnected) operation.
 Coda from Carnegie Mellon University focuses on bandwidth-adaptive operation (including disconnected operation) using a client-side cache for mobile computing. It is a descendant of AFS-2. It is available for Linux under the GPL.
 Distributed File System (Dfs) from Microsoft focuses on location transparency and high availability. Available for Windows under a proprietary software license.
 HAMMER and HAMMER2 – DragonFly BSD's filesystems for clustered storage, created by Matt Dillon.
 InterMezzo from Cluster File Systems uses synchronization over HTTP. Available for Linux under GPL but no longer in development since the developers are working on Lustre.
 LizardFS a networking, distributed file system based on MooseFS
 Moose File System (MooseFS) is a networking, distributed file system. It spreads data over several physical locations (servers), which are visible to a user as one resource. Works on Linux, FreeBSD, NetBSD, OpenSolaris and macOS. Master server and chunkservers can also run on Solaris and Windows with Cygwin.
 Scality is a distributed fault-tolerant filesystem.
 Tahoe-LAFS is an open source secure, decentralized, fault-tolerant filesystem utilizing encryption as the basis for a least-authority replicated design.
 A FAT12 and FAT16 (and FAT32) extension to support automatic file distribution across nodes with extra attributes like local, mirror on update, mirror on close, compound on update, compound on close in IBM 4680 OS and Toshiba 4690 OS. The distribution attributes are stored on a file-by-file basis in special entries in the directory table.

Distributed parallel file systems 
Distributed parallel file systems stripe data over multiple servers for high performance. They are normally used in high-performance computing (HPC).

Some of the distributed parallel file systems use an object storage device (OSD) (in Lustre called OST) for chunks of data together with centralized metadata servers.

Lustre is an open-source high-performance distributed parallel file system for Linux, used on many of the largest computers in the world. 
Parallel Virtual File System (PVFS, PVFS2, OrangeFS).  Developed to store virtual system images, with a focus on non-shared writing optimizations. Available for Linux under GPL.

Distributed parallel fault-tolerant file systems 
Distributed file systems, which also are parallel and fault tolerant, stripe and replicate data over multiple servers for high performance and to maintain data integrity. Even if a server fails no data is lost. The file systems are used in both high-performance computing (HPC) and high-availability clusters.

All file systems listed here focus on high availability, scalability and high performance unless otherwise stated below.

In development:

 zFS from IBM (not to be confused with ZFS from Sun Microsystems or the zFS file system provided with IBM's z/OS operating system) focus on cooperative cache and distributed transactions and uses object storage devices. Under development and not freely available.
 HAMMER/ANVIL by Matt Dillon
 PNFS (Parallel NFS) – Clients available for Linux and OpenSolaris and back-ends from NetApp, Panasas, EMC Highroad and IBM GPFS
 Coherent Remote File System (CRFS) – requires Btrfs
 Parallel Optimized Host Message Exchange Layered File System (POHMELFS) and Distributed STorage (DST). POSIX compliant, added to Linux kernel 2.6.30

Peer-to-peer file systems 
Some of these may be called cooperative storage cloud.

 Cleversafe uses Cauchy Reed–Solomon information dispersal algorithms to separate data into unrecognizable slices and distribute them, via secure Internet connections, to multiple storage locations.
 Scality is a distributed filesystem using the Chord peer-to-peer protocol.
 IPFS InterPlanetary File System is p2p, worldwide distributed content-addressable, file-system.

Special-purpose file systems 
 aufs an enhanced version of UnionFS stackable unification file system
 AXFS (small footprint compressed read-only, with XIP)
 Barracuda WebDAV plug-in. Secure Network File Server for embedded devices.
 Boot File System is used on UnixWare to store files necessary for its boot process.
 cdfs (reading and writing of CDs)
 Compact Disc File System (reading and writing of CDs; experimental)
 cfs (caching)
 Cramfs (small footprint compressed read-only)
 Davfs2 (WebDAV)
 Freenet – Decentralized, censorship-resistant
 FTPFS (FTP access)
 GmailFS (Google Mail File System)
 GridFS – GridFS is a specification for storing and retrieving files that exceed the BSON-document size limit of 16 MB for MongoDB.
 lnfs (long names)
 LTFS (Linear Tape File System for LTO and Enterprise tape)
 MVFS – MultiVersion File System, proprietary, used by Rational ClearCase.
 Nexfs Combines Block, File, Object and Cloud storage into a single pool of auto-tiering POSIX compatible storage.
 OverlayFS – A union mount filesystem implementation for Linux. Used mainly by Docker for its image layers.
 romfs
 SquashFS (compressed read-only)
 UMSDOS, UVFAT – FAT file systems extended to store permissions and metadata (and in the case of UVFAT, VFAT long file names), used for Linux
 UnionFS – stackable unification file system, which can appear to merge the contents of several directories (branches), while keeping their physical content separate
 Venti – Plan 9 de-duplicated storage used by Fossil.

Pseudo file systems 
 devfs – a virtual file system in Unix-like operating systems for managing device nodes on-the-fly
 procfs – a pseudo-file system, used to access kernel information about processes
 tmpfs – in-memory temporary file system (on Unix-like platforms)
 sysfs – a virtual file system in Linux holding information about buses, devices, firmware, filesystems, etc.
 debugfs – a virtual file system in Linux for accessing and controlling kernel debugging
 configfs – a writable file system used to configure various kernel components of Linux
 sysctlfs – allow accessing sysctl nodes via a file system; available on NetBSD via PUFFS, FreeBSD kernel via a 3rd-party module, and Linux as a part of Linux procfs.
 kernfs – a file system found on some BSD systems (notably NetBSD) that provides access to some kernel state variables; similar to sysctlfs, Linux procfs and Linux sysfs.
 wikifs – a server application for Plan 9's virtual, wiki, file system

Encrypted file systems 
 eCryptfs – a stacked cryptographic file system in the Linux kernel since 2.6.19
 Secure Shell File System (SSHFS) – locally mount a remote directory on a server using only a secure shell login.
 EncFS, GPL Encrypted file system in user-space
 Rubberhose filesystem
 EFS – an encrypted file system for Microsoft Windows systems and AIX. An extension of NTFS
 ZFS, with encryption support.

File system interfaces 
These are not really file systems; they allow access to file systems from an operating system standpoint.

 FUSE (file system in userspace, like LUFS but better maintained)
 LUFS (Linux userland file system – seems to be abandoned in favour of FUSE)
 PUFFS (Userspace filesystem for NetBSD, including a compatibility layer called librefuse for porting existing FUSE-based applications)
 VFS Virtual Filesystem

See also 
 Shared resource
 Comparison of file systems
 Filing Open Service Interface Definition
 Computer data storage

References

External links 
 File Systems

File systems